The 1973–74 UC Irvine Anteaters men's basketball team represented the University of California, Irvine during the 1973–74 NCAA Division II men's basketball season. The Anteaters were led by fifth year head coach Tim Tift and played their home games at Crawford Hall. The anteaters finished the season with an overall record of 14–12 and were not invited to a post season tournament.

Previous season
The 1972–73 UC Irvine Anteaters men's basketball team finished the season with a record of 15–13. They were not invited to a post season tournament.

Roster

Schedule

|-
!colspan=9 style=|Regular Season

Source

References

UC Irvine Anteaters men's basketball seasons
UC Irvine Anteaters
UC Irvine Anteaters